Rolf Oesterreich (born 28 November 1952 in Rostock, East Germany) is a German figure skating coach and former competitor. With Romy Kermer, he is the 1976 Olympic silver medalist.

Oesterreich began skating in Berlin. He first teamed up with Marlies Radunsky. From 1972 on he skated with Romy Kermer. He skated for the club SC Dynamo Berlin and was representing East Germany. His coach was Heidemarie Seiner-Walther.

Romy Kermer and Rolf Oesterreich won the silver medal at the Winter Olympics 1976 in Innsbruck. In March 1976, they were both awarded the Patriotic Order of Merit for their Olympic success.

After their figure skating career they married each other. Oesterreich now works as a figure skating coach at the club TUS Stuttgart.

Results

Pairs with Kermer

Pairs with Radunsky

Men's singles

See also
 Figure Skating
 World Figure Skating Championships

References

External links

https://web.archive.org/web/20060502042510/http://www.eklscberlin.arcgraph.de/
http://www.tus-eissport.de

1952 births
Living people
Sportspeople from Rostock
People from Bezirk Rostock
German male pair skaters
Sportspeople from Mecklenburg-Western Pomerania
Figure skaters at the 1976 Winter Olympics
Olympic figure skaters of East Germany
Olympic silver medalists for East Germany
Olympic medalists in figure skating
World Figure Skating Championships medalists
European Figure Skating Championships medalists
Medalists at the 1976 Winter Olympics
Recipients of the Patriotic Order of Merit in bronze